The Irish Future Series or Irish International is an international badminton tournament held in Ireland. This tournament has been a Future Series level, another tournament for higher tournament level is Irish Open.

Previous winners

References 

Badminton tournaments in Ireland